Lan Ying (ca. 1585–1664) was a Chinese painter of landscapes, human figures, flowers and birds who was active during the Ming Dynasty (1368–1644).

Biography
Lan was born in Hangzhou in the Zhejiang province. His style name was 'Tianshu' (田叔), and his pseudonyms were 'Diesou' (蜨叟), 'Shi Toutuo' (石頭陀), and Dongguo laoren'. Lan's painting followed the style of Huang Gongwang and Wu Zhen. Lan was trained at the Painting Academy of the South Song Dynasty. Lan's son Lan Yu and grandson Lan Shen also grew up to be painters.

References

1580s births
1664 deaths
Artists from Hangzhou
Ming dynasty landscape painters
Painters from Zhejiang